The Granadine Confederation was a short-lived federal republic established in 1858 as a result of a constitutional change replacing the Republic of New Granada. It consisted of the present-day nations of Colombia and Panama and parts of northwestern Brazil. In turn, the Granadine Confederation was replaced by the United States of Colombia after another constitutional change in 1863.

History
The short but complicated life of the Granadine Confederation was marked by rivalry between the Conservative Party and the Liberal Party, which ended in a Civil War (1860–1862). It also was a period of hostility against the Roman Catholic Church, and of divided regionalism.

The Granadine Confederation was established by the Constitution of 1853, considered pro-federalist or centro-federalist because it gave more autonomy to the provinces, which multiplied to 35 provinces during the administration of Manuel María Mallarino (1855–1857), each with its own provincial constitution.

States

After the disestablishment of Gran Colombia, the centralized government of the Republic of New Granada which was ratified by the constitution of 1843, was soon challenged by the independentist feelings of the different regions; particularly the provinces of Azuero, Chiriquí, Panamá, and Veraguas, which were demanding autonomous status. The Constitution of 1853 permitted this so that on February 27, 1855, the State of Panamá could be created within the Republic of New Granada.

Soon others followed, regionalism was too strong, and in order to prevent a division like the one Greater Colombia had, with Venezuela and Ecuador quitting the union, congress allowed the creation of other sovereign states:

 Federal State of Antioquia was created from Antioquia Province on June 11, 1856.
 Federal State of Santander, which included the provinces of Socorro and Pamplona, was created May 13, 1857.

The Law of June 15, 1857 created the other states that would later form parts of the Confederation Granadine:

 Federal State of Bolívar (Estado Federal de Bolívar), which included Cartagena Province.
 Federal State of Boyacá (Estado Federal de Boyacá), which included the provinces of Tunja, Tundama, Casanare, and the cantons of Chiquinquirá and Vélez.
 Federal State of Cauca (Estado Federal de Cauca), which included the provinces of Buenaventura, Chocó, Pasto and Popayán and the region of Caquetá.
 Federal State of Cundinamarca (Estado Federal de Cundinamarca), which included the province of Mariquita, Bogotá, Neiva, and Tolima.
 Federal State of Magdalena (Estado Federal de Magdalena), which included the provinces of El Banco, Padilla, Santa Marta, Tenerife and Valledupar.

The nation was formed by the union of these Sovereign States which were confederated in perpetuity to form a Sovereign Nation, free and independent with the name “Confederation Granadine".

During 1858 the new constituency, with its majority of conservatives, convened and signed the Constitution for the Confederation Granadine of 1858, confirming Bogotá as its Federal Capital.

On July 12, 1861, after fighting the constitutional government of the president Mariano Ospina Rodríguez, the general Tomas Cipriano de Mosquera created the Sovereign State of Tolima, created out of the State of Cundinamarca. This was confirmed and legalized by the rest of the states of the Colombian Union, by means of Article 41 of the Pact of the Union on September 20, 1861, reaffirming the legality of the institutionalism of Tolima.

Constitution of 1858
By the conservative mandate of Mariano Ospina Rodríguez, Congress passed and approved a new Constitution for the country on May 22, 1858.
By this constitution, the country was named officially as the Confederation Granadine and conformed by eight sovereign states.

More power and representation was given to the provinces, as each state could have its own legislature and elect its own president.

The vice presidency was abolished and replaced with a dignitary named by the Congress.

The president and senators could be elected to serve a period of four years and the Representatives of the House for two.

The Constitution also listed the powers and obligations of the states and of the central government, and gave parameters to creating new laws and amending the constitution. It included the basic freedoms, and rights of the people. The constitution was important as it signaled the official beginning of the confederacy and set legal parameters.

Civil war

Even though the Constitution of 1858 had legalized federalism, the politics of the president Mariano Ospina Rodríguez favored centralism. This conservativism clashed with the wishes of the states which wanted more power and autonomy.

This caused some leaders to consider the administrative base of the federation as a notion to underestimate the authority of the states, and led the national government to view the independent aspirations of the states as a threat to the overall nation.

The political tension came to its pinnacle in 1859 when Congress passed two controversial laws. On April 8, 1859, Congress passed a law giving the President the right to remove the duly appointed governors of the states and appoint one of his choosing. With this law, the president secured the power of the Conservative Party.

On May 10, 1859, another law was passed, this one giving the president the power to create administrative departments in states so to control their resources and how would they be used.

These laws angered many liberal leaders, specially general Tomás Cipriano de Mosquera, an ex-president of New Granada, and a powerful and influential politician in the country. He denounced these laws as unconstitutional and made contact with other liberal leaders in other states, who gave him their support to revolt against the president, even though not all agreed with his ideas, they supported him and accepted to allow him to become Supreme Director of War, because they saw no other way to get back their autonomy than to revolt against the government.

By a decree of May 8, 1860, Mosquera broke relations with the national government, declared himself Supreme Director of War, and declared a separated state, the Sovereign State of Cauca. From that moment the country entered a civil war.

In retaliation, the government of Ospina Rodríguez endorsed insurrections against the liberal governments in some states, the first of these armed conflicts being in Santander, against the government of Eustorgio Salgar during 1859; the Confederacy Granadine declared war on the state of Santander, and sent its army to subdue Eustogio Salgar, who was captured along with other important figures, including Aquileo Parra.

Civil war then spread to other states, including Bolívar, Antioquía, Magdalena and Cauca. In an unexpected act, Mosquera captured Bogotá on June 18, 1861, declared himself president of the provisional government, and arrested Ospina Rodríguez, his brother Pastor Ospina, and Bartolomé Calvo, the newly elected president of the confederacy.

The war ended in 1862 when the last leaders of the conservative opposition died or gave up.

Geography

Borders
According to the constitution of 1858, the limits of the territory of the Granadine Confederation were to be the same as those of 1810, that divided the territory of the Viceroyalty of New Granada from the Captaincy General of Venezuela, the Captaincy General of Guatemala, and the Portuguese possessions in Brazil. In the west, the limits would be those marked provisionally by the treaty with the government of Ecuador on July 9, 1856, and all treaties with that republic.

Regions
The Granadine Confederation covered a vast region, sharply divided by its geography. The country was divided by the three cordilleras of the Andes mountains, the Magdalena River which was the main artery of navigation in the country, and the Isthmus of Panama which was isolated in its own region. The jungles in the south only added to the confusion. The unclear borders were never definitively marked, and the terrain secluded its residents, mostly natives, from the rest of the country.

Four isolated regions divided the country; the Oriental Region included Cundinamarca, Tolima, Boyacá and Santander; the Cauca Region, which included Chocó and extended to Marmato; the Region of Antioquía, that extended down to the River Chinchiná near Manizales; and the Atlantic Region.

Each of these regions behaved like a separate country without relations to the others. This isolation and lack of roads was a severe restraint on the economy, as its already distant nuclei were too far from each other for trade to grow and investment to take place.

Religion
During the brief life of the Confederacy Granadine, the Roman Catholic Church was a constant target for the government. Although its population was still very  Roman Catholic, and religion formed an essential part of life, the government approved a number of laws directed at controlling the clergy and church property during this time.

During the first presidency of general Tomás Cipriano de Mosquera during 1849, Mosquera adopted a radical position with the church, approving laws confiscating religious property and subjecting the clergy to government rules. He banished the Society of Jesus from the Republic of New Granada, expelled the Archbishop of Bogotá. The closure of convents and monasteries drove nuns into poverty, although many were taken into homes by citizens. All of this drew direct criticism from the Vatican, even causing Pope Pius IX to condemn the government of Colombia for its actions.

After the creation of the Confederation Granadine, during the government of Mariano Ospina Rodríguez, the Jesuits were once again welcomed into the country and religious tensions eased.

This brief period of religious calm ended when Mosquera, who assumed the presidency a second time, continued with his anticlerical attitude driving once again the Jesuits out of the Confederacy giving them only seventy-two hours to leave the country or risk imprisonment, as he blamed them of endorsing the insurgency.
He passed a couple of anticlerical laws. One of these was the Tuition of Cults, a law that prohibited religious officials to exercise their functions without authorization from the government, thus requiring special licenses to preach. Through another law, he confiscated the property of religious communities and organizations such as schools, hospitals, monasteries, churches, land, houses and other properties that could be sold. Those organizations that opposed were banned and abolished.

These laws were not approved as a direct attack on the Church, but what was pretended was to improve the situation of the national treasury which was depleted because of the Civil War currently being waged. The Church assets were sold to the best buyer, improving industry and investment while putting money in the hands of the state. However the laws provided little assistance to the farmers who finished up owning little of the land as Mosquera intended, with his slogan of “Land for those who work it”.

Rionegro Convention
The Granadine Confederation ended on 8 May 1863, with the signing of the Constitution of 1863 by the Rionegro Convention, which officially changed the name of the country to the United States of Colombia, consisting of nine sovereign states, and where new rules and powers were given to the states and presidents. The Liberals had come to fear the great power of Mosquera, and they drafted the new constitution to limit his power. The Radical Liberals defended a federal government based on a laissez-faire policy, in which regional and local autonomy were protected, where there was no national army, a society with basic rights and freedoms, based on education and open market values, with no intervention by the church.

See also
Tomás Cipriano de Mosquera
United States of Colombia
Confederalism
History of Colombia

Notes

 
1863 disestablishments in South America
19th century in Colombia
States and territories established in 1858
1858 establishments in South America